State Express is a 1938 Indian Hindi-language action film directed by Vijay Bhatt for his production company Prakash Pictures. The film's music was composed by Lallubhai Nayak and the dialogues were written by Sampatlal Srivastava. Zakaria Khan, named Jayant by Vijay Bhatt, and who was to become a famous character artist, started his career as a leading man in several of Bhatt's earlier films from Bombay Mail (1935) to Bijli (1939), including State Express The film starred Jayant, Sardar Akhtar, Umakant, Lallubhai Nayak, Shirin and Ismail.

State Express involved a masked heroine (Sardar Akhtar) who performed several stunts, a young prince (Jayant), and his scheming uncle. The film had the basic ‘stunt’ film features, masked characters, a gorilla, two dogs Tommy and Tiger (given poster credit) and crashing trains.

Cast
 Jayant
 Sardar Akhtar
 Umakant
 Shirin
 Zaverbhai
 M. Zahur
 Lallubhai Nayak
 Ismail
 Jehangir
 Chhotejaan
 Vithaldass
 Athavale

Review And Box office
State Express is cited by Rajadhyaksha and Willemen as a "successful film" doing well at the box-office. The main draw of the film was a "performing gorilla" and Sardar Akhtar's songs and performance.  The film was one of the "best stunt films" from Bhatt, who normally made mythologicals.

Soundtrack
The music was composed by Lallubhai Nayak, with the lyricist being Pandit Anuj. The singers were Sardar Akhtar, Jayant, Lallubhai Nayak and Rajkumari.

Song list

References

External links

1938 films
1930s Hindi-language films
Indian action films
Indian black-and-white films
Films directed by Vijay Bhatt
1930s action films
Hindi-language action films